Neosocialism was a political faction that existed in France and Belgium during the 1930s and which included several revisionist tendencies in the French Section of the Workers' International (SFIO).

During the 1930s, the faction gradually distanced itself from revolutionary Marxism and reformist socialism while stopping short of merging into traditional class-collaborative socialism of radical-socialist progressivism. Instead, they advocated a revolution from above which they termed as a constructive revolution. In France, this brought them into conflict with the Socialist Party's traditional policy of anti-governmentalism and the neosocialists were expelled from SFIO.

From the start, this linked them to fascist politics in France and many neosocialists expressed admiration for Italian Fascism. This tendency later emerged as an ideological orientation in its own right with the Neosocialist Party which advocated authoritarianism and antisemitic policies as well as intimate cooperation with the Nazis.

History 
In the wake of the Great Depression, a group of deputies led by Henri de Man in Belgium (the leader of the Belgian Labour Party's right-wing, and founder of the ideology of planisme, i.e. planism, meaning economic planning) and in France by Marcel Déat and Pierre Renaudel (leader of the SFIO's right wing), René Belin of the General Confederation of Labour, the Young Turk current of the Radical-Socialist Party (Pierre Mendès-France) argued that the unprecedented scale of the global economic crisis, and the sudden success of national-populist parties across Europe, meant that time had run out for socialists to slowly pursue either of the traditional stances of the parliamentary left: gradual, progressive reformism or Marxist-inspired popular revolution. Instead, influenced by Henri de Man's planism, they promoted a "constructive revolution" headed by the state, where a democratic mandate would be sought to develop technocracy and a planned economy.

This approach saw great success in the Belgian Labour Party in 1933-1934, where it was adopted as official policy with the support of the party's right (De Man) and left (Paul-Henri Spaak) wings, though by 1935 enthusiasm had waned. Such ideas also influenced the non-conformist movement on the French right.

Marcel Déat published in 1930 Perspectives socialistes (Socialist Perspectives), a revisionist work closely influenced by Henri de Man's planism. Along with over a hundred articles written in La vie socialiste (The Socialist Life), the review of the SFIO's right-wing, Perspective socialistes marked the shift of Déat from classical socialism to neosocialism. Déat replaced class struggle with class collaboration and national solidarity, advocated corporatism as a model of social organisation, replaced the notion of socialism with anti-capitalism and supported a technocratic state which would plan the economy and in which parliamentarism would be replaced by political technocracy.

The neosocialist faction inside of the SFIO which included the senior party figures Marcel Déat and Pierre Renaudel was expelled at the November 1933 party congress, partly for its admiration for Italian fascism, and largely for its revisionist stances: the neosocialists advocated alliances with the middle classes and favoured making compromises with the bourgeois Radical-Socialist Party to enact the SFIO's program one issue at a time. After having been expelled from the SFIO, Marcel Déat and his followers created the Socialist Party of France – Jean Jaurès Union (1933–1935); by the close of 1935 the emergence of the Popular Front had stolen the thunder for much of the neo-socialists' tactical and policy proposals, and the Jean Jaurès Union merged with the more traditional class-collaborative Independent Socialists and  Socialist Republicans to form the small Socialist Republican Union. Within the General Confederation of Labour  trade union, neosocialism was represented by René Belin's Syndicats (then Redressements)'s faction. On the other hand, Henri de Man's planism influenced the left-wing of the progressive-centrist Radical-Socialist Party, known as Young Turks (among them Pierre Mendès-France).

At first the neosocialists remained part of the broader left. Déat led his splinter party into the Socialist Republican Union, a merger of various revisionist socialist parties, and participated in the Popular Front coalition of 1936. But disillusionment in democracy eventually caused many neosocialists to distance themselves from the traditional left and call for more authoritarian government. After 1936 many evolved toward a form of participatory and national socialism which led them to join with the reactionary right and support the collaborationist Vichy regime during World War II. For instance, René Belin and Marcel Déat became members of the Vichy government. As a result, Déat's neosocialism was discredited in France after the war.

See also 
 Dirigisme
 Economic planning
 Production for use
 Technocracy
 Thorstein Veblen
 Yellow socialism

References

Further reading 
 

Economic planning
Far-right politics in France
Fascism
Political movements in France
Right-wing anti-capitalism